Nezhnost'  (Russian spelling: Нежность, English translation: Tenderness) is a Soviet Russian-language song.

The song was composed in 1965. The music was written by Aleksandra Pakhmutova, with lyrics by Nikolay Dobronravov and Sergey Grebennikov.

"Tenderness" was one of the most beloved songs from cosmonaut of the USSR, and the most beloved — the first cosmonaut of the planet Earth — Yuri Gagarin.

Nezhnost''' was performed in 1967 by Tatiana Doronina (as Nyura) in Tatiana Lioznova's film Tri topolya na Plyushchikhe (Three Poplars at Plyuschikha Street). Originally it was recorded by Maya Kristalinskaya in 1966 and was covered many times by many artists in Soviet Union and Russia, including versions made by Yuri Gulyayev, Joseph Kobzon, Tamara Sinyavskaya, Lyudmila Zykina, Dmitri Hvorostovsky, Tamara Gverdtsiteli, Maria Codrianu, Latvian singer Olga Pīrāgs. Also, the song was recorded in 1967 by French singer Frida Boccara in Russian (Soviet album «Поёт Фрида Боккара» / Frida Boccara sings, Melodiya), in 1969 by Cuban singer Lourdes Gil and Francis Goya (as Tenderness — CD album A Tribute To Alexandra Pakhmutova, 2002). The song has been live performed in 1999 by Alla Bayanova in French, accompanied by Mikhail Pletnev.

Several Western arrangements of the tune are known under the title Tenderness''. These include a version in both English and Russian by Jason Kouchak  and in particular, Marc Almond's version which is known for his live performance at the Manege of the First Cadet Corps (Saint Petersburg) on October 1, 2008  and Thomas Anders' version is known for his live performance at the Kremlin Palace on April 23, 2009.

Notes

External links
Sung by Maya Kristalinskaya
Sung by Alla Bayanova
imdb.com

Russian songs
Soviet songs
1967 songs